Alabam may refer to:
Alabama, a U.S. state
Alabam, Arkansas, an unincorporated community
"Alabam" (song), a song by Cowboy Copas
Old Alabam, Arkansas, an unincorporated community